Kozhemyakin (from кожемяка meaning a leather worker) is a Russian masculine surname, its feminine counterpart is Kozhemyakina. It may refer to
Anatoli Kozhemyakin (1953–1974), Russian football player
Iryna Kozhemyakina (born 1980), Ukrainian sprinter 
Oleg Kozhemyakin (born 1995), Russian football player 
Vladislav Kozhemyakin (footballer, born 1983), Russian football player
Vladislav Kozhemyakin (footballer, born 2001), Russian football player

Russian-language surnames
Occupational surnames